The GP40 is a 4-axle diesel-electric locomotive built by General Motors' Electro-Motive Division between November 1965 and December 1971. It has an EMD 645E3 16-cylinder engine generating .

The GP40 is  longer than its EMD 567D3A-engined predecessor, the GP35, and distinguished visually by its three 48-inch radiator fans at the rear of the long hood, while the GP35 has two large fans and a smaller one in between. It was built on a  frame; the GP35 was built on a  frame - as was the GP7, 9, 18, and 30. The difference in length can be seen in the GP40's ten handrail stanchions compared to the GP35's nine.

1,187 GP40s were built for 28 U.S. railroads; 16 were built for one Canadian carrier, Canadian National; and 18 were built for two Mexican carriers, Ferrocarril Chihuahua al Pacífico and Ferrocarriles Nacionales de México. 60 units were built with high-short-hoods and dual control stands for Norfolk & Western Railway. Two passenger versions, the GP40P and GP40TC, were also built, but on longer frames to accommodate steam generators and HEP equipment.

On January 1, 1972, the GP40 was discontinued and replaced by the GP40-2, which has a modular electrical system and a few minor exterior changes.

GP22ECO 

The GP22ECO is a locomotive built from recycled GP40/GP40-2 parts. The frame, trucks, and carbody are refurbished, while the 16-645 engine is replaced with a new 8-710-ECO engine.  The electrical system is replaced with a modern microprocessor-based system.  Horsepower is reduced to 2,150 due to the smaller engine.

Images

Original Owners

See also 
EMD GP40-based passenger locomotives
List of GM-EMD locomotives
List of GMD Locomotives

References 

 
 

GP40
GP40
B-B locomotives
Diesel-electric locomotives of the United States
Railway locomotives introduced in 1965
Standard gauge locomotives of the United States
Standard gauge locomotives of Canada
Standard gauge locomotives of Mexico
Diesel-electric locomotives of Canada
Diesel-electric locomotives of Mexico